The Rotorwing-Aero 3D-RV is an American autogyro that was designed by Monte Hoskins and produced by  Rotorwing-Aero of Salt Lake City, Utah, introduced in 1989. Now out of production, when it was available the aircraft was supplied in the form of plans for amateur construction.

Design and development
The aircraft has a standard empty weight of  when equipped with a Rotax 503 or Rotax 582 engine. With heavier engines it can be registered in the US Experimental - Amateur-built category.

The 3D-RV features a single main rotor, a single-seat open cockpit without a windshield, tricycle landing gear with hydraulic disk brakes, plus a tail caster.

The aircraft fuselage is made from bolted-together aluminum tubing and welded 4130 steel tubing. In this configuration the aircraft flew acceptably, but did not climb well on hot days at higher density altitudes. The minimum control speed is 

The initial propeller used was a  two bladed ground adjustable unit, but the plans specify a three-bladed ground adjustable design of  diameter.

The prototype used a conventional low landing gear design, but this was later developed into a high landing gear to set the vertical center of gravity to the prob hub height to prevent longitudinal stability issues and bunt "push-over" accidents. The final design features a tall aluminium rudder.

The manufacturer estimated the construction time from the supplied plans as 400 hours.

Operational history
By 1998 the company reported that 35 sets of plans had been sold and three aircraft were completed and flying.

One builder reported an eight-month completion time.

Specifications (3D-RV)

See also
List of rotorcraft

References

External links
Photo of a Rotorwing-Aero 3D-RV in flight

3D-RV
1980s United States sport aircraft
1980s United States ultralight aircraft
1980s United States civil utility aircraft
Homebuilt aircraft
Single-engined pusher autogyros
Aircraft first flown in 1989